The Rosicrucian Egyptian Museum (REM) is devoted to ancient Egypt, located at Rosicrucian Park in the Rose Garden neighborhood of San Jose, California, United States.

It was founded by the Ancient Mystical Order Rosae Crucis (AMORC). The Rosicrucian Order continues to support and expand the museum and its educational and scientific activities. The museum holds the largest collection of ancient Egyptian antiquities in the Western United States, and is located next to the Rosicrucian headquarters.

History

The founder of AMORC, Harvey Spencer Lewis, was a collector of various artifacts with mystical symbolism, some of them from the East. His very first artifact was a small Sekhmet statue. In 1921 he contributed financially to the archaeological excavations at Tel el Amarna (Akhetaten, the capital city of the 18th dynasty pharaoh Akhenaten) of the Egypt Explorations Society of Boston by receiving donations from AMORC members. In return, the Egypt Explorations Society donated several Egyptian antiquities to AMORC.

In 1928, he presented to the public a collection named "The Rosicrucian Egyptian Oriental Museum", located at the administration buildings of AMORC at San Jose, California. Supposedly, the San Jose location was chosen because of the affordability of the land back then. After Lewis' tour in Egypt in 1929, AMORC received many more artifacts and donations, and as a result the collection grew significantly, with more than 2000 exhibits.

The second Imperator of AMORC, Ralph Maxwell Lewis, son of H. Spencer Lewis, built new buildings for the museum, which opened in November 1966.

By that time the museum was unique in:
 Having the largest exhibition of Ancient Egyptian antiquities in the Western US.
 Being the only such museum in the world with buildings constructed in Ancient Egyptian architectural style.
 Having a purpose-built planetarium adjacent to the museum, the fifth opened in the United States, and the first with a Star Projector built in the country, constructed by H. Spencer Lewis.
 Having its buildings set in an Egyptian Revival park.

In 1995, Julie Scott, M.A., S.R.C., who is a practicing Rosicrucian, became director of the Rosicrucian Egyptian Museum.

In 2017, the museum was claiming 110,000 visitors per year, including 26,000 sixth-graders. The building is also used by the Rosicrucians for meditation and group discussions.  In 2018, the museum became a zero-energy building.

Notable exhibits

A notable activity took place in 1999 when the Rosicrucian Egyptian Museum started the traveling exhibition "Women of the Nile" accompanied by many lectures. "Women of the Nile" travelled across the United States of America and Canada, and continued until 2001. In 2000–2002, a stone figure of Cleopatra VII from the collection was displayed in Rome, London, and Chicago in similar exhibitions.

The Rosicrucian Egyptian Museum's child mummy traveled to Stanford University in nearby Palo Alto on May 6, 2005 to be studied under CT scans and other high-resolution methods of remote sensing, in a collaboration between the museum, Silicon Graphics, and Stanford University Hospital and the NASA Biocomputational Lab. The results were released at the 75th Anniversary of the Museum on August 6, 2005, with detailed scans. One of the scanning images won the Science and Engineering Visualization Challenge 2006 co-sponsored by the National Science Foundation and Science. In November 2017, x-ray images of the mummy were released that provide a 3D visualization of the girl's remains.

A statue of Taweret, the ancient Egyptian hippopotamus-like goddess of pregnant women and childbirth, once stood at the entrance, but has been moved to the side. Since 2004, the Museum has been completely renovated, with the following Gallery themes:
Afterlife and Rock Cut Tomb
Daily Life and Other Cultures
Kingship and Palace
Temple (Sekhmet) and Akhenaten's Amarna period
Rotating Exhibits: Since 2015: The Rosicrucian Alchemy Exhibit

The museum also holds a 1.5 million year old stone hand ax, but it is not exhibited to the public.

Rock-cut tomb replica

The Rosicrucian Egyptian Museum contains a composite replica of an ancient Egyptian rock-cut tomb, based on photos and sketches taken by Rosicrucian expeditions to tombs at Beni Hasan, in order to give the guests the experience of being in such an excavation. Below are photographs of the interior of the replica tomb, largely containing scenes from the Book of the Dead. The dark interior of the tomb replica is evident.

The Rosicrucian Alchemy Exhibit 

Beginning in 2015, for the 100th Anniversary of the incorporation of AMORC in America, which owns and operates the Museum, the museum's Rotating Exhibits Gallery became The Rosicrucian Alchemy Exhibit. The highlights of the collection were put on display in this exhibit.

This exhibit, curated by the alchemist Dennis William Hauck, features a journey through the seven stages of the alchemical process, a meditation chamber featuring the Azoth of the Philosophers and a recorded guided meditation, and a full-size reproduction of an alchemist’s workshop. There is also a reproduction of the Ripley Scroll with illustrative commentary.

The Exhibit forms the kernel of what will be the first alchemy museum in the United States, and the largest in the world. It will be housed in the present "Rose-Croix University International" building at Rosicrucian Park. The RCUI Building also contains a working alchemy lab.

See also
 List of museums of Egyptian antiquities

References

External links

 
 Rosicrucian Alchemy Exhibit Official website

Egyptian Revival architecture in the United States
Egyptological collections in the United States
Museums in San Jose, California
Archaeological museums in California
Museums established in 1928
1928 establishments in California
Rosicrucianism
Hermeticism